The 2021 Conference USA football season was the 26th season of college football play for Conference USA (C-USA). The season started on August 28, 2021 and ended on December 23, 2021. The conference consisted of 14 members in two divisions. It was part of the 2021 NCAA Division I FBS football season.

Previous season

Due to the COVID-19 pandemic, Old Dominion did not play the 2020 season, leaving the conference with 13 participating teams. The rest of the conference played the full season, with some games postponed or cancelled for reasons relating to the pandemic. The Marshall Thundering Herd won the East Division, while the UAB Blazers won the West Division. In the 2020 Conference USA Football Championship Game, the Blazers defeated the Thundering Herd 22–13.

Preseason

Preseason Media Poll
The Preseason Media Poll was released on July 19. Marshall was voted the favorite to win the East Division, while UAB was voted favorite for the West Division.

East Division (votes for 1st):1. Marshall (17)2. Florida Atlantic (6)3. Western Kentucky (1)4. Charlotte5. Middle Tennessee6. FIU7. Old Dominion

West Division (votes for 1st):1. UAB (15)2. UTSA (9)3. Louisiana Tech4. Southern Miss5. Rice6. North Texas7. UTEP

Preseason player awards
Preseason player awards were announced on July 20.

Offensive Player of the Year: Sincere McCormick (Junior, UTSA runningback)
Defensive Player of the Year: DeAngelo Malone (Senior, Western Kentucky defensive back)
Special Teams Player of the Year: Lucas Dean (Junior, UTSA punter)

Preseason awards

The following list contains C-USA players who were included on preseason watch lists for national awards.

Head coaches
Doc Holliday was released from the Head Coach position at Marshall after 11 seasons with the program. He was replaced by Charles Huff, who had previously been the running backs coach at Alabama.

Will Hall took over as the new permanent Head Coach at Southern Miss, filling the vacancy left after Jay Hopson had resigned one game into the previous season.

Note: All stats shown are before the start of the 2021 season.

Post-Season changes
On November 10, Butch Davis announced that he would not return to FIU after the school declined to extend his contract.
On November 26, Louisiana Tech announced that they were firing head coach Skip Holtz. Holtz was allowed to coach the final game of the season before being dismissed immediately after. The school announced on November 30 that Texas Tech offensive coordinator Sonny Cumbie would take over as the new head coach.

Rankings

Schedule

All times Eastern time.

Week 0

Week 1

Week 2

Week 3

Week 4

Week 5

Week 6

Week 7

Week 8

Week 9

Week 10

Week 11

Week 12

Week 13

Conference USA Championship Game

Postseason

Bowl Games

Conference USA records vs other conferences

2021–2022 records against non-conference foes:

Conference USA vs Power 5 matchups
This is a list of games C-USA has scheduled versus power conference teams (ACC, Big 10, Big 12, Pac-12, BYU, Notre Dame and SEC). All rankings are from the current AP Poll at the time of the game.

Conference USA vs Group of Five matchups
The following games include C-USA teams competing against teams from the American, MAC, Mountain West, or Sun Belt.

Conference USA vs FBS independents matchups
The following games include C-USA teams competing against FBS Independents, which includes Army, Liberty, New Mexico State, UConn, or UMass.

Conference USA vs FCS matchups

Awards and honors

Player of the week honors

Conference USA Individual Awards
The following individuals received postseason honors as voted by the Conference  USA football coaches at the end of the season.

All-Conference Teams
The following players were selected as part of the Conference USA's All-Conference Teams.

All-Americans

The 2021 College Football All-America Teams are composed of the following College Football All-American first teams chosen by the following selector organizations: Associated Press (AP), Football Writers Association of America (FWAA), American Football Coaches Association (AFCA), Walter Camp Foundation (WCFF), The Sporting News (TSN), Sports Illustrated (SI), USA Today (USAT) ESPN, CBS Sports (CBS), FOX Sports (FOX) College Football News (CFN), Bleacher Report (BR), Scout.com, Phil Steele (PS), SB Nation (SB), Athlon Sports, Pro Football Focus (PFF) and Yahoo! Sports (Yahoo!).

Currently, the NCAA compiles consensus all-America teams in the sports of Division I-FBS football and Division I men's basketball using a point system computed from All-America teams named by coaches associations or media sources.  The system consists of three points for a first-team honor, two points for second-team honor, and one point for third-team honor.  Honorable mention and fourth team or lower recognitions are not accorded any points.  Football consensus teams are compiled by position and the player accumulating the most points at each position is named first team consensus all-American.  Currently, the NCAA recognizes All-Americans selected by the AP, AFCA, FWAA, TSN, and the WCFF to determine Consensus and Unanimous All-Americans. Any player named to the First Team by all five of the NCAA-recognized selectors is deemed a Unanimous All-American.

NFL Draft

The following list includes all C-USA players who were drafted in the 2022 NFL Draft.

References